Harold Fraser (16 June 1937 – 30 September 2016) was a South African weightlifter. He competed in the men's middleweight event at the 1960 Summer Olympics.

References

External links
 

1937 births
2016 deaths
South African male weightlifters
Olympic weightlifters of South Africa
Weightlifters at the 1960 Summer Olympics
Sportspeople from Cape Town